Ronnie Dürrenmatt (born 30 May 1979, in Grenchen) is a Swiss slalom canoeist who competed from the mid-1990s to the late 2000s, specializing in the C1 class. At the 2004 Summer Olympics in Athens he finished 11th in the C1 event.

World Cup individual podiums

Other highlights
 9th place at the 2005 World Championships
 7th place at the 2006 European Championships
 9-times Swiss champion between 1995-2008

References

1979 births
Canoeists at the 2004 Summer Olympics
Living people
Olympic canoeists of Switzerland
Swiss male canoeists
People from Solothurn
Sportspeople from the canton of Solothurn